The Aqaba Flagpole in Aqaba, Jordan is a  tall flagpole. This height makes it the 6th tallest free–standing and 7th tallest flagpole in the world. It carries the flag of the Arab Revolt commemorating the Battle of Aqaba that took place in 1917. The flagpole can be seen from Israel, Egypt, and Saudi Arabia. The flagpole was built in 2004 and opened on 3 October 2004.

Information

Technical data
Pole height: 130 meters (427 feet)

Pole weight: 344,000 pounds (156 tonnes)

Number of pole sections: 11

Bottom of pole diameter: 103 inches (2.6 metres)

Top of pole diameter: 42 inches (1.1 metres)

Bottom section plate thickness: 1.26 inches – Fy = 50 ksi

Top section plate thickness: .394 inches – Fy = 36 ksi

Maximum section length: 

Mating flanges thicknesses: Minimum: 1.58 inches, maximum 

Flange bolts maximum diameter: 3 inches

Bolt material: A354, Fy = 115 ksi

Design criteria
Flag size:  by 

Flag material: Polyester

Wind speed criteria: (pole and flag) - 

Wind speed criteria: (pole only) - 

Seismic zone: 4 (Uniform Building Code)

Near seismic source: Less than 2 km (Aqaba Rift)

Codes
ANSI/NAAMFP-1001-97 – Guide Specification for Design Loads of Metal Flagpoles

Standard Specification for Structural Supports for Highway Signs, AASHTO

Structural engineer of record: Neil Moore and Associates

Builder: Trident Support Corp. with assistance from US Flag and Flagpole Supply LP
Contractor : Sahara contracting corporation, Amman, Jordan

References

Aqaba
Buildings and structures in Jordan
Buildings and structures completed in 2004
Flagpoles